Norfolk Herald of Arms Extraordinary is an officer of arms in England.  As an officer extraordinary, Norfolk is a royal herald, though not a member of the corporation of the College of Arms in London.  Beginning in 1539 this officer was a herald to the dukes of Norfolk, though the first holder, John James, was paid a salary by King Henry VIII.  Subsequent Norfolk heralds have been officers extraordinary, though the office has not always been filled but rather revived when required.  The badge of office, assigned in 1958, is blazoned as Two Ostrich Feathers saltirewise each charged with a Gold Chain laid along the quill.  It derives from the ostrich feather badge granted by King Richard II around 1387 as a mark of special favor to Thomas Mowbray, Duke of Norfolk, Marshal of England.  Mowbray was also the first to be styled Earl Marshal.

The current Norfolk Herald of Arms Extraordinary is Maj. David Rankin-Hunt, CVO, MBE, KCN, TD.  Rankin-Hunt was appointed by Royal Warrant in October 1994 and is the ninth person to hold the office. Following the retirement of Sir Conrad Swan as Garter King of Arms in 1995 he assumed some responsibility for advising certain Commonwealth Realms and a few non-Commonwealth Countries on Honours and Awards. In the last fifteen years he has designed and instituted Honours systems and individual Orders, Decorations and Medals for over eight countries. These include Antigua and Barbuda, Grenada, St Lucia, Tonga, Tuvalu, Solomon Islands, Barbados and Albania.

Holders of the office

See also
 Heraldry
 Officer of Arms

References
Citations

Bibliography
 The College of Arms, Queen Victoria Street : being the sixteenth and final monograph of the London Survey Committee, Walter H. Godfrey, assisted by Sir Anthony Wagner, with a complete list of the officers of arms, prepared by H. Stanford London, (London, 1963)
 A History of the College of Arms &c, Mark Noble, (London, 1804)

External links
The College of Arms
CUHGS Officer of Arms Index

English offices of arms